Robert Norman Schistad (born October 28, 1966) is a former Norwegian ice hockey player. He was born in Wingham, Ontario,  and played for the Stavanger club Viking IK. He played for the Norwegian national ice hockey team at the 1992 and 1994 Winter Olympics.

References

1966 births
Living people
Ice hockey people from Ontario
Ice hockey players at the 1992 Winter Olympics
Ice hockey players at the 1994 Winter Olympics
Norwegian ice hockey players
Norwegian ice hockey goaltenders
Olympic ice hockey players of Norway
People from Wingham, Ontario